Compulsive sexual behaviour disorder (CSBD), also known as hypersexual disorder, is a pattern of behavior involving intense preoccupation with sexual fantasies and behaviours that cause distress, are inappropriately used to cope with stress, cannot be voluntarily curtailed, and risk or cause harm to oneself or others. This disorder can also cause impairment in social, occupational or other important functions.

CSBD is not a diagnosis found in ICD-10 or DSM-5. It was proposed in 2010 for inclusion in the Diagnostic and Statistical Manual of Mental Disorders Fifth Edition (DSM-5) of the American Psychiatric Association (APA), but was ultimately not approved. ICD-11 currently includes a diagnosis for "Compulsive Sexual Behaviour Disorder", which is categorized under "Impulse Control Disorders".

Diagnosis

ICD-11
ICD-11 includes a diagnosis for "Compulsive Sexual Behaviour Disorder". CSBD is not an addiction.

"Compulsive Sexual Behaviour Disorder" is defined as a persistent pattern of failure to control intense, repetitive sexual impulses or urges resulting in repetitive sexual behaviour.

Symptoms may include repetitive sexual activities becoming a central focus of the person's life to the point of neglecting health and personal care or other interests, activities and responsibilities; numerous unsuccessful efforts to significantly reduce repetitive sexual behaviour; and continued repetitive sexual behaviour despite adverse consequences or deriving little or no satisfaction from it.

Criteria:
Pattern of failure to control intense, sexual impulses or urges and resulting repetitive sexual behaviour
Manifested over an extended period of time (e.g., 6 months or more)
Causes marked distress or significant impairment in personal, family, social, educational, occupational, or other important areas of functioning (distress that is entirely related to moral judgments and disapproval about sexual impulses, urges, or behaviours is not sufficient to meet this requirement)

It has been argued that the CSBD diagnosis is not based upon sex research.

DSM-5
DSM-5 and DSM-5-TR have no such diagnosis.

Different literature descriptions
People with hypersexual disorder experience multiple, unsuccessful attempts to control or diminish the amount of time spent engaging in sexual fantasies, urges, and behaviors. Individuals may engage in sexual behaviors that they experience as compulsive, despite knowledge of adverse medical, legal, and/or interpersonal consequences, and may neglect social and recreational activities and role responsibilities.

For a valid diagnosis of hypersexual disorder to be established, symptoms must persist for a period of at least 6 months and occur independently of mania or a medical condition.

Treatment

Medicines
As of end of 2019, FDA had approved no medicines for it.

Cognitive-behavioural perspective 
Some treatment guides suggest shame at the core of CSBD mechanism. The shame is associated with the cognitive schema of self-defectiveness, a feeling of social pain and isolation and functions in two ways. Firstly, chronic shame derived from social stigma or early traumatic experiences augments the soothing function of sexual behaviour. That makes sexual behaviour compulsive. And secondly, that excessive or inappropriate sexual behaviour, as it is considered socially unacceptable, causes extra shame and forms a self-sustaining cycle of CSBD. Therefore, treatment is primarily aimed at shame reduction and social reintegration.

History
Hypersexual disorder was recommended for inclusion in the DSM-5 (Diagnostic and Statistical Manual of Mental Disorders, Fifth Edition) by the Sexual and Gender Identity Disorders Workgroup (Emerging Measures and Models, Conditions for Further Study). It was ultimately not approved. The term hypersexual disorder was reportedly chosen because it did not imply any specific theory for the causes of hypersexuality, which remain unknown. A proposal to add sexual addiction to the DSM system had been previously rejected by the APA, as not enough evidence suggested to them that the condition is analogous to substance addictions, as that name would imply.

Rory Reid, a research psychologist in the Department of Psychiatry at the University of California Los Angeles (UCLA), led a team of researchers to investigate the proposed criteria for Hypersexual Disorder. Their findings were published in the Journal of Sexual Medicine where they concluded that the given criteria are valid and the disorder could be reliably diagnosed.

The DSM-IV-TR, published in 2000, includes an entry called "Sexual Disorder—Not Otherwise Specified" (Sexual Disorder NOS), for disorders that are clinically significant but do not have code. The DSM-IV-TR notes that Sexual Disorder NOS would apply to, among other conditions, "distress about a pattern of repeated sexual relationships involving a succession of lovers who are experienced by the individual only as things to be used".

See also

 Compulsive masturbation
 Don Juanism
 Klüver–Bucy syndrome
 Persistent sexual arousal syndrome
 Pornography addiction
 Sexual obsessions

References

External links

WikiSaurus:libidinist

Sexual dysfunctions
Human sexuality
Sexual health
Sexual addiction